Aleksey Parfenkov (born 13 September 1967) is a Belarusian freestyle skier. He competed in the men's aerials event at the 1994 Winter Olympics.

References

1967 births
Living people
Belarusian male freestyle skiers
Olympic freestyle skiers of Belarus
Freestyle skiers at the 1994 Winter Olympics
Sportspeople from Minsk